Gidon Lev (born Peter Wolfgang Löw, 3 March 1935) is a Czechoslovakian-born Israeli dairy farmer and Holocaust survivor who was imprisoned at the Nazi concentration camp of Theresienstadt between the ages of 6 to 10. Of the 9,000 children imprisoned in or transported through Theresienstadt concentration camp, he is one of the more than 2000 children estimated to have survived.

Early life 
Lev was born in Karlovy Vary, Czechoslovakia, on 3 March 1935. Both of his parents came from secular Jewish families who had lived for many generations in the Austro-Hungarian Empire.

His family fled to Prague when Nazi Germany annexed the Sudetenland in 1938. In 1941, Lev and his family were transported to the Theresienstadt concentration camp, a Nazi ghetto in Terezín, Czechoslovakia.

Theresienstadt concentration camp 
Lev was six years old when he was imprisoned in the Theresienstadt concentration camp with his family in 1941. Twenty-six of Lev's family members were murdered in the Holocaust, including his father, who died while being transported from Auschwitz to Buchenwald.

Lev was 10 years old when the Red Army liberated the concentration camp in May 1945. A total of 15,000 children were imprisoned at Terezín during the course of the war, according to Yad Vashem and the Terezin museum, and Lev was one of the very few to survive.

Later life 
After their release from the concentration camp and the end of the World War II, Lev and his mother immigrated first to the United States and then to Canada in 1949. Ten years later, in 1959, Lev arrived in Israel and took up communal farming in the Kibbutz Hazorea in the Jezreel Valley.

Lev served in the Israeli Defense Force during the Six-Day War and the War of Attrition in 1967.

TikTok career 
Lev opened a TikTok account in July 2021 and has published videos primarily aimed at Holocaust education. He has received media coverage for speaking out against Holocaust denial and antisemitism.

In 2021, Lev released a TikTok video criticizing and demanding an apology from American podcaster Joe Rogan for drawing parallels between the Holocaust and mandatory proof-of-vaccination against COVID-19.

Published works

Private life 
Lev was married twice and has six children, 15 grandchildren and two great-granddaughters. He was married to his second wife for forty years, until she died of cancer in 2012.

References 

Non-independent sources

1935 births
Living people
Jewish concentration camp survivors
Theresienstadt Ghetto survivors
People from Karlovy Vary
Israeli farmers
Czech emigrants to Israel
Israeli people of the Six-Day War